() is a Finnish word meaning "evil spirit" and a popular Finnish profanity, used similarly to English "god damn", although it is considered much more profane. It is most likely the most internationally known Finnish curse word.

Origins 
The name is of Indo-European origin; Perkwunos is the reconstructed name of the god of thunder.

Some researchers consider  to be an original name of the thunder god Ukko, the chief god of the Finnish pagan pantheon, but this view is not shared by all researchers. There are related words in other Finnic languages: in Estonian,  means hell, in Karelian  means an evil spirit.

Introduction of Christianity 
As Finland was Christianized, the old Finnish deities were regarded as demons. This led to the use of "" as a translation for "Devil" in the Finnish translation of the Bible.

References 

Finnish gods
Thunder gods
Profanity
Finnish profanity
Internet memes